Maria Whang (1865-1937) was a Korean-American educator and community organizer.  In 1913, she became the first leader of the Korean Women's Association in the Territory of Hawaii. Whang was born in Pyongan Province, Korea. In 1905, she emigrated to Hawaii with her daughter and two sons. When they arrived in Hawaii, she told her son Ok Kang about her escape from her affluent husband who had many mistresses.  Whang was a Methodist, and the church assisted her in moving to the United States. She felt that in Korea she was "not allowed to be anything", and desired the freedom she saw in the United States. She was an early educator of plantation children, and she established the Korean Women's Association (Taehan Puinhoe) which merged in 1919 with the Korean Ladies Relief Society.

References

Bibliography

1865 births
1937 deaths
Korean educators
People of the Territory of Hawaii
Korean feminists
Korean Methodists
Korean emigrants to the United States
American people of Korean descent